Corrida do Ouro is a Brazilian telenovela produced and broadcast by TV Globo. It premiered on 8 July 1974 and ended on 24 January 1975, with a total of 179 episodes. It's the 14th "novela das sete" to be aired at the timeslot. It is created by Lauro César Muniz and Gilberto Braga, directed by Daniel Filho and Reynaldo Boury.

Cast

References

External links 
 

1974 telenovelas
TV Globo telenovelas
Brazilian telenovelas
1974 Brazilian television series debuts
1975 Brazilian television series endings
Portuguese-language telenovelas
Television shows set in Rio de Janeiro (city)